KTTF-LP (95.3 FM) is a terrestrial American low power radio station, licensed to Tomball, Harris County, Texas, United States, and is owned by the City of Tomball.

References

External links
 Official Website
 

TTF-LP
TTF-LP
Radio stations established in 2015
Community radio stations in the United States